John Gore may refer to:

John Gore (fl.1414-1431), MP for Malmesbury
John Gore (Lord Mayor) (died 1636), English merchant, Lord Mayor of London, 1624
John Gore (Royal Navy officer, died 1790), American sailor who accompanied James Cook
John Gore, 1st Baron Annaly (1718–1784), Irish peer and MP for Jamestown and Longford County
John Gore (Royal Navy officer, born 1772) (1772–1836), British naval commander
John J. Gore (1878–1939), U.S. federal judge 
John Gore (died 1773), British MP for Cricklade
John Gore (1621–1697), British MP for Hertford
John Gore (died 1763), British MP for Great Grimsby
John Ellard Gore (1845–1910), Irish amateur astronomer
Jack Gore (1899–1971), British rugby union and rugby league footballer
John F. Gore (born 1926), American military officer
John Gore (theatre producer) (born 1961), British theatre producer
John Gore (priest) (1820–1894), Anglican priest in Ireland

See also
John Ormsby-Gore, 1st Baron Harlech (1816–1876), British peer and Conservative MP for Caernarvonshire and Shropshire North
John Gore Jones (1820–1868), Australian politician